Earth has an innermost inner core, distinct from its inner core. It is within the inner core and this region is solid iron in a different, but unknown structure to the inner core.

The existence of an inner core was proposed by Adam Dziewonski and Miaki Ishii to explain the discrepancies in certain fit to travel-time wave models of the inner core. It is contested whether  the innermost inner core is a distinct entity and that the data can be explained in other ways.

Proposed models 
The innermost inner core model proposes a distinct laterally homogeneous anisotropic sphere within the inner core.

Estimates differ on the size of the innermost core. Dziewonski and Ishii think a radius of 300 km. Trampert et al. put forth a different model, with a radius of 400  km.

Implications 
The existence of distinct anisotropic spheres within the inner core would represent evidence of two distinct periods of inner-core formation. It has also been theorized that the anisotropy observed represents an unknown phase change in iron. Understanding the anisotropic structure of the innermost inner core would be an important constraint on the inner core's composition.

Other explanations 
In 2012, Lythgoe et al. proposed the existence of anisotropic hemispheres within the inner core as an alternative to the innermost inner core theories. The study suggests that Ishii et al.'s conclusions were due to faulty statistical analysis, and claims the data are best described by hemispheric anisotropy.

References 

Structure of the Earth
2002 in science
2003 in science